Bustos may refer to:

People
 Bustos (surname)

Places
 Bustos, Bulacan, Philippines
 Corral de Bustos, Córdoba, Argentina
 Bustos, Oliveira do Bairro, Aveiro, Portugal

Other uses
 Bustos Media, a media corporation from Sacramento, California
 21418 Bustos, a main-belt asteroid discovered in 1998